Mostofa Sarwar Farooki (born 2 May 1973) is a Bangladeshi film director, producer and screenwriter. His films Third Person Singular Number, Television, No Bed Of Roses were critically acclaimed across the world and received numerous international and national awards. He founded filmmakers' movement called "Chabial".

Early life
Farooki was born 2 May 1973 in the Nakhalpara neighborhood of Dhaka, Bangladesh. He attended Tejgaon Government Boys' High School.

Career
Farooki has set a new trend in terms of presentation and direction in the early 2000. His debut film was Bachelor (2003) starring Humayun Faridi, Aupee Karim, Ferdous Ahmed, Shabnur and many others. Then his second film, a political satire Made In Bangladesh (2007) starring Zahid Hasan, Tariq Anam Khan, Shahiduzzaman Selim and others. His third film Third Person Singular Number starring Nusrat Imrose Tisha, Topu, Mosharraf Karim was premiered in Busan International Film Festival (2009). It had its European premier in International Film Festival Rotterdam, It was also in the official competition 2009 Middle East International Film Festival. After that he made a short film named Ok Cut. His fourth feature Television (2012) starring Chanchal Chowdhury, Nusrat Imrose Tisha, Mosharraf Karim and Kazi Shahir Huda Rumi was the closing film of Busan International Film Festival and won the APSA Grand Jury Prize in 2013, as well as a further five international awards from Dubai, Jogja-NETPAC Asian Film Festival, Rome's Asiatica Film Mediale, and Kolkata International Film Festival. His fifth feature film Ant Story starring Sheena Chohan and Noor Imran Mithu was nominated for the Golden Goblet Awards and the Dubai International Film Festival's Muhr AsiaAfrica Awards. In 2014 it was also in competition for APSA and both the Singapore and Kerala International Film Festivals. He finished his sixth feature film Doob: No Bed of Roses starring international star Irrfan Khan, Nusrat Imrose Tisha, Parno Mittra, Rokeya Prachy and others. It was an official project of Film Bazar India 2013. It won Dubai Film Market Award and Kommersant Jury Prize at Moscow International Film Festival 2017. He is all set to release his upcoming ambitious project, a one-shot film, Saturday Afternoon starring Nusrat Imrose Tisha, Parambrata Chatterjee, Zahid Hasan, Eyad Hourani, Mamunur Rashid, a Bangladesh-Germany-Russia co-production inspired by the Dhaka terror attack incident of 1 July 2016 at the Holey Artisan Bakery, Gulshan. The film had its world premiere at the main competition section of 41st Moscow International Film Festival 2019 and won the Russian Federation of Film Critics Jury Prize and Komersant Prize. It is the first of three films of his identity trilogy, the second one being No Land's Man starring Nawazuddin Siddiqui and the third, Memoria will be based on the Rohingya refugees.

Farooki was appointed as an international jury of Asia Pacific Screen Awards 2015,Busan International Film Festival 2017 and Kolkata International Film Festival 2017 and Dhaka International Film Festival 2020. He was also an invited guest and speaker at many other prestigious film festivals. In 2019, he received the Fazlul Haq Memorial Award 2018 and was also honoured by Kaler Kantho newspaper on their anniversary.

Farooki also makes commercials for local and international brands like Djuice, Citycell, Banglalink, Ekhanei.com, Crown Cement, Grameenphone, Close-Up, Robi etc. His most popular commercial was for Meril Soap bar starring Tisha.

Cinematic style
Farooki's body of work address such themes as middle class angst, urban youth romance, deception-hypocrisy and frailty of individual, frustration about the confines of one's culture and conservative Muslim concepts of guilt and redemption.

Brisbane's Asia Pacific Screen Awards says of his work, "His films often deal with the way individuals free themselves from the limitations placed on them by their identity, economic circumstances and belief systems. To counter the deprivation they face in real life, his characters often seem to create a fantasy world around them, lending elements of magical realism to Farooki's signature style." "Mostofa Sarwar Farooki could be the next South-east Asian filmmaker to break out", The Hollywood Reporter wrote in the review of his film Television. Varietys Jay Weissberg wrote. "Mostofa Sarwar Farooki is a key exemplar of Bangladeshi new wave cinema movement".

Personal life

Farooki is married to the actress Nusrat Imrose Tisha since 16 July 2010. Together they have a daughter who has been named as Ilham Nusrat Farooki, born on 5 January 2022.

Filmography

Television

Web series

Chabial 

Farooki is the founder of Chabial, a film makers club. This group of young film makers used to be Farooki's assistant directors. They then used local cable television networks as a platform to master their hands in story telling and created an audience for the stories they tell. Their works have managed to connect primarily with the youth in urban and suburban parts of the Bangladeshi society for the realism in story topics and realism in execution.

References 

Living people
People from Dhaka
Bangladeshi film directors
Bangladeshi television directors
Bangladeshi male writers
Best Film Directing Meril-Prothom Alo Critics Choice Award winners
1973 births